The  is an automobile nameplate used by the Japanese automobile manufacturer Suzuki since 1999 for several minivan models:

 Suzuki Every Landy, a passenger minivan based on the tenth-generation Carry/fourth-generation Every sold between 1999 and 2005
 Changhe Suzuki Landy, a passenger minivan based on the fifth-generation Every sold in China between 2007 and 2012
 Rebadged Nissan Serena for the Japanese market between 2007 and 2022
 Rebadged R90 series Toyota Noah for the Japanese market since 2022

References

External links 

  (Japan)

Landy
Cars introduced in 2007
Minivans